Minye Kyawswa I of Ava (also known as Hsinbyushin Minye Kyawswa Gyi (ဆင်ဖြူရှင် မင်းရဲကျော်စွာကြီး, ; –) was king of Ava (Inwa) from 1439 to  1442. In less than three years of rule, the second king from the royal house of Mohnyin (မိုးညှင်းဆက်) had recovered four major former vassal states of Ava: his native Mohnyin, Kale (Kalay), Taungdwin and Toungoo (Taungoo), and was about to capture a fifth, Mogaung, which was achieved shortly after his death. Despite the successes farther afield, his attempt to capture the closer districts of Pinle and Yamethin failed.

His reign marked Ava's first attempt to forcefully reclaim the former vassal states that it had lost since the mid-1420s. As king, Minye Kyawswa implemented a more aggressive policy against the rebel states, which he had advocated for since his days as crown prince of Ava (1426–1439) but could not get his father King Mohnyin Thado to prioritize. He launched a major military campaign in every dry season of his short reign. Ava's campaigns in the kingdom's north benefited greatly from Ming China's campaigns against the powerful Shan-speaking state of Mong Mao. King Minye Kyawswa I's expansionist policy would be continued by his successor and brother King Narapati I under whose leadership Ava would reach its height of power in the early second half of the 15th century.

Early life
The future king was the eldest child of a minor noble family of Shin Myat Hla and Thado (from present-day Mandalay Region, Myanmar). He was born in Mohnyin (present-day Kachin State) , about eight months after his parents had relocated to the northern Shan-speaking frontier state, following his father's appointment as sawbwa (lord governor) of the state by King Minkhaung I of Ava. He grew up in Mohnyin with his younger brother, and two younger sisters. Unlike his brother, who spent time at the capital Ava (Inwa) as a page of King Thihathu from 1421 to 1425, chronicles have no record of Minye Kyawswa spending his early years outside of Mohnyin. He apparently remained alongside his father to his early teens when he was appointed sawbwa of Moshwe, a small district of Mohnyin.

Thado's rebellion
His small town life ended in February 1426. That month, his father formally revolted against King Min Nyo's regime, and the 15-year-old sawbwa and his 12-year-old brother, sawbwa of Wuntho, became active participants in the rebellion. The brothers' first assignment was notable in that they achieved their first battlefield victory by not strictly following their father's orders. They had sailed down the Irrawaddy with a flotilla of war boats to Thissein, Ava's forward garrison with 2000 troops and 50 war boats, while Thado marched with his army towards the garrison. Though they were to wait for their father, whose army was still ten marches away, the brothers decided to launch a surprise attack from the port-side of the fort. Ava forces were not expecting an attack, and withdrew in disarray. Despite the success, their father, a former co-commander-in-chief of the Ava military, would not put his eager but inexperienced sons in the vanguard again for the rest of the campaign. The brothers' next assignment came only in May as Thado's forces closed in on Ava: the brothers dutifully marched to the east of Ava (Inwa) to block a possible escape route of King Nyo but saw no action. Thado entered the royal capital unopposed on 16 May 1426.

On 20 May 1426, Thado formally ascended the throne, and made his eldest son einshei min (အိမ်ရှေ့မင်း, lit. "Lord of the Front Place", heir apparent) with the title of Minye Kyawswa, and gave Salin, Sagu, and Legaing districts (all three in modern Minbu District) in fief. The new crown prince also married his double first cousin Min Hla Nyet, daughter of his paternal aunt Shin Myat Hla and his maternal uncle Thiri Zeya Thura.

Crown prince years

Throughout his father's 13-year reign, Minye Kyawswa would prove a loyal deputy albeit with policy differences. The royal chronicles portray the crown prince as far more distrustful of the vassal rulers, and more eager to use force against the rebel states. But he failed to significantly alter the policies of Thado, who never made a sustained effort to establish his authority outside the core zone. The first such episode took place just a few months into Thado's reign when Minye Kyawswa urged Thado to arrest the governors of Toungoo (Taungoo) and Taungdwin, who purportedly had come to Ava to pledge their allegiance. The son argued that the governors—Thinkhaya III of Toungoo and Thihapate III of Taungdwin—had probably come to assess Ava's military strength but the father disagreed. The son's suspicion soon proved correct: the two governors revolted right after they got back to their respective regions.

It was not an isolated incident. The crown prince could not get his father to take a harder stance against Prince Minye Kyawhtin either. Although the second-most senior prince of the previous dynasty had never renounced his claim to the Ava throne, and by 1427 had occupied Pinle, only 70 km away from the capital, Thado was unwilling to send the full force against the prince, grandson of his deceased lord, King Minkhaung. Indeed, Thado had even freed the prince back in August 1426, only to see him revolt again just a few months later. Even when Thado finally authorized Minye Kyawswa to lead an expedition to Pinle in late 1428, he gave his son just a small force (1500 troops, 300 cavalry, and 20 elephants). The crown prince dutifully went on to laid siege to the fortified town but the outcome was never in doubt; he had to withdraw after three months, in early 1429.

Minye Kyawswa would not get another chance for the next four years. By then, his father had essentially abandoned the reunification project; turned to religion; and began devoting much of the kingdom's resources on building Buddhist stupas and monasteries. (In all, Thado would build a total of 27 new pagodas, temples and monasteries, including one at Rajagaha (ရာဇဂြိုဟ်) in India during his reign. According to a preliminary calculation by Michael Aung-Thwin, the 27 projects may have cost the royal treasury, 1.62 million kyats (ticals) of silver, "not including the usual endowments of people and land for their subsequent upkeep.") In 1431, Thado formally ceded the southernmost districts of Tharrawaddy and Paungde to King Binnya Ran I of Hanthawaddy Pegu without putting up a fight. In late 1433, Minye Kyawswa managed to get his father's permission to lead an expedition to Pinle and other southeastern states in revolt. Although his army was larger (5000 infantry, 300 cavalry and 120 elephants), it still was not enough to take any rebel-held town. He again came back empty handed in early 1434.

The failed campaign was the last one Thado would authorize. Over the next five years, the king continued to focus on his pagoda building spree, and little else. Even when Pegu openly seized Toungoo in 1436, his response was not launch a punitive campaign but to order a recalibration of the Burmese calendar, over the objection of the court.

Reign

Thado died in April 1439, and Minye Kyawswa succeeded without incident. The two key vassals who could challenge the new 28-year-old king—his brother Prince Thihathu of Prome and his uncle Gov. Nawrahta I of Myedu—both acknowledged him. Even with their support, the realm he inherited was a rump polity that extended only along the narrow north-south axis of the Irrawaddy river between Myedu in the north to Prome in the south.

The following major former vassal states remained out of Ava's orbit:

The new king immediately instituted a policy to reclaim the rebel states. (Chronicles attribute this urgency to the two competing prophecies given by the court astrologers at his accession. The story goes that all but one predicted that the new king would reign three years while a lone astrologer predicted that the new king would conquer three (unspecified) countries; Minye Kyawswa is said to have preferred the lone astrologer's prophecy. He may have believed in the larger group's prophecy as well. He as king would not go to the front in any of the campaigns during his reign although he as crown prince did so in at least three campaigns.) At any rate, Minye Kyawswa shifted much of the resources of his narrow realm, which nonetheless did include the most productive granaries of the kingdom, Mu valley, Minbu and a large portion of Kyaukse, away from his father's expensive pagoda building projects, and ordered the court to prepare for war in the upcoming dry season.

His first target was not his nemesis Minye Kyawhtin at Pinle, just 70 km away from Ava, but his birthplace Mohnyin by the Chinese border, some 400 km away. It was entirely an opportunistic decision. Mohnyin's overlord Mong Mao had been under attack by the Chinese since 1436, and Mohnyin itself was in a fight with Kale (Kalay), another former vassal state of Ava. In , Minye Kyawswa ordered his brother-in-law Gov. Thihapate I of Pakhan to march to Mohnyin with a sizeable army (9000 men, 500 cavalry, 30 elephants). The show of force worked. The sawbwa of Mohnyin submitted without a fight, and the sawbwa of Kale also submitted soon after. Minye Kyawswa replaced the sawbwas with his brothers-in-law Thihapate (at Mohnyin) and Thiri Zeya Thura (at Kale/Kalay) to hold his new forward bases. But he decided to hold off an attack on Mogaung itself—as Tho Ngan Bwa by then had survived the first round of Chinese attacks (1436–1439). For his part, Tho Ngan Bwa did not contest Ava's takeover of Mohnyin as he remained preoccupied with the Chinese, (who would return in 1441).

In 1440, Minye Kyawswa launched a campaign to conquer the southeastern states. But with the northern front was still in a stalemate, he could allocate only a smaller army (7000 men, 400 cavalry, 20 elephants) to the operation, which was led by his uncle Nawrahta I of Myedu. The results were decidedly mixed. The small army still could not take heavily fortified Pinle and Yamethin. Indeed, its capture of the next two states Taungdwin and Toungoo may have been helped by the decision of the rulers of those regions to engage the army in open battle. (The Toungoo army fell apart after their leader Min Saw Oo was killed atop his war elephant by Yazathingyan, one of the commanders of the Ava army.) Gaining Toungoo in particular was a major achievement. The southeastern state was never part of his father's realm, and had been controlled by the southern Hanthawaddy Kingdom since 1436. He appointed Tarabya governor of Toungoo. He also gave Taungdwin to the portfolio of his brother-in-law Thiri Zeya Thura, the sawbwa of Kale.

In the next dry season, Minye Kyawswa reopened the northern front, ordering an attack on Mogaung. (The Ming records say that the Chinese, who had resumed their attacks against Mong Mao since June 1441, had asked Ava and Hsenwi to join in on the attack, offering the Luchuan district (present-day Longchuan County, Yunnan, China) as reward for capturing Si Renfa (Tho Ngan Bwa). However, Ava apparently was not acting because of the Chinese offer as it did not exchange Luchuan for Tho Ngan Bwa. The noncompliance led the Ming court in 1445 to threaten an attack on Ava itself.) His two brothers in-law, the sawbwas of Mohnyin and Kale, went on to lay siege to Mogaung, about 90 km northeast of Mohnyin. During the siege, the king died in Ava in December 1441/January 1442, (probably in early January 1442). The 31-year-old king had reigned less than three years.

Aftermath
Minye Kyawswa did not leave a male heir. In fact, he had only one daughter, Min Mya Hnit. Although his younger brother Viceroy Thihathu of Prome was next in line of succession, the court initially preferred his brother-in-law Thihapate of Mohnyin. (According to Aung-Thwin, the ministers may have preferred Thihapate because they wished to wield greater power at court, knowing that Thihathu was likely to be a stronger leader than Thihapate.) The ministers rushed a messenger on horseback to the outskirts of Mogaung, 500 km north of Ava, where Thihapate was besieging the town, to invite him to be king. But he refused, saying that he was neither a son or younger brother of the king, and that the court should give the throne to the rightful heir, Thihathu. Only then did the court send a royal flotilla down the Irrawaddy to Prome (Pyay) to invite Thihathu to Ava. Thihathu accepted, and arrived at Ava on 11 March 1442. He formally ascended to the throne with the reign name of Narapati on 6 April 1442. Meanwhile, Thihapate had captured Mogaung, and presented Tho Ngan Bwa to the new king at the coronation ceremony.

Legacy
Minye Kyawswa's legacy was his policy to restore Ava's former borders. In a marked change from his father's policy, Minye Kyawswa used Ava's still considerable resources to expand his authority outside the core narrow zone he inherited. His goals of reestablishing a "miniature Pagan" were reflected in a 1440 inscription from his reign, which according to Aung-Thwin "used, perhaps for the first time, amyo-tha [အမျိုးသား] ("sons of the race, or countrymen") as a reference to the people in the Kingdom of Ava. Although it was likely a reference mainly to the dominant Burmese speakers of the kingdom, the context also suggests that it included many who were not originally born Burmese speakers, but belonged to other ethnolinguistic groups, who had become "citizens" of the kingdom." In all, in his short reign of less than three years, Minye Kyawswa successfully had brought four key vassal states (Mohnyin, Kale, Taungdwin and Toungoo) back into the fold, and begun the eventual capture of Mogaung, which was achieved shortly after his death. His expansionist policy would be continued by his brother under whose reign Ava reached its "apogee".

Administration
Minye Kyawswa kept his father's court led by Chief Minister Yazathingyan. He also kept his uncle Nawrahta at Myedu and his younger brother Thihathu at Prome (Pyay). While he used his uncle to lead a major campaign, he did not involve his younger brother in any of the campaigns or any major decisions. Instead, he installed his brothers-in-law Thihapate of Mohnyin and Thiri Zeya Thura in three of the four newly conquered states (Mohnyin, Kale, Taungdwin), and appointed them to lead the 1441–1442 Mogaung campaign. He apparently trusted Thihapate as his only child Min Mya Hnit was married to Thihapate's son Thinkhaya. At any rate, the distance between the brothers may have led to the court initially selecting Thihapate to be the next king after Minye Kyawswa's death.

List of military campaigns
The following is a list of military campaigns in which he went to the front per the royal chronicles. The campaigns which he ordered as king but did not go to the front are not included.

Historiography
The main chronicles all say that the king was an able leader who possessed good martial abilities but was also short-tempered. But with regard to the key events of his life, various chronicles provide different information. In particular, the earlier chronicles the Zatadawbon Yazawin and Maha Yazawin erroneously say the king was born in 1401; the date was corrected to 1410/1411 in the later chronicles.

Ancestry
The king was descended from a distant branch of the Pinya and Pagan royal lines from his father side, and from the maternal line, a two times great grandchild of King Thihathu of Pinya.

Notes

References

Bibliography
 
 
 
 
 
 
 
 
 

Ava dynasty
1410 births
1442 deaths
15th-century Burmese monarchs